Louis Joseph "Leapin' Louie" Fontinato (January 20, 1932 – July 3, 2016) was a Canadian defenceman in the National Hockey League with the New York Rangers from 1954 to 1961 and the Montreal Canadiens from 1961 to 1963.

NHL career
Lou Fontinato was a rugged defender and the most feared enforcer of his time. He started his career with New York during the 1954-55 season. The following year, he led the NHL in penalty minutes. Fontinato became the first player in league history to record over 200 minutes in penalties in a season. He also led the league in that category in 1957-58 and 1961–62 (with Montreal). With the Rangers, Fontinato and Gordie Howe had a running feud that culminated in a fight at Madison Square Garden on February 1, 1959, in which Howe broke the nose and dislocated the jaw of "Leapin' Lou". Fontinato was eventually traded to the Montreal Canadiens for Hall-of-Fame great Doug Harvey at the tail-end of his career. Fontinato's career came to an abrupt and violent end in 1963 at the Montreal Forum when he missed a check on left-winger Vic Hadfield of the Rangers behind the Montreal net, slammed head first into the boards, and became paralyzed for a month.

Career statistics

Regular season and playoffs

Personal life
Fontinato later ran a cattle operation near Eden Mills, Ontario. He died in Guelph, Ontario on July 3, 2016. Fontinato's great nephew, Greg McKegg, is also a professional ice hockey player.

Legacy 
In the 2009 book 100 Ranger Greats, the authors ranked Fontinato at No. 95 all-time of the 901 New York Rangers who had played during the team's first 82 seasons. 

Gilles Groulx's 1964 National Film Board, 30-minute documentary film Un Jeu Si Simple includes footage of Lou Fontinato including his career-ending neck injury vs. NY Rangers on March 9, 1963.

In an email interview with Wayne Gretzky, Gordie Howe said a fight with Lou Fontinato was the most memorable of his career.

References

External links

 

1932 births
2016 deaths
Canadian people of Italian descent
Canadian ice hockey defencemen
Ice hockey people from Ontario
Montreal Canadiens players
New York Rangers players
Saskatoon Quakers players
Sportspeople from Guelph
Vancouver Canucks (WHL) players